GameStop: Rise of the Players is a 2022 American documentary film directed by Jonah Tulis and produced by Blake J. Harris, who worked on Console Wars together.

Synopsis 
The documentary chronicles the GameStop short squeeze of 2021 which saw GameStop's stock rise over 2,500% amidst rampant volatility. This story is told mostly from the viewpoint of several value investors who participated in sharing their due diligence on social media, most notably Roaring Kitty's YouTube streams.

Interviewees 
 Justin Dopierala, Founder and President of DOMO Capital
 Rod Alzmann, Managing Director at Wook Capital and Co-Founder of research publishing platform GMEdd.com
 Joe Fonicello, Co-Founder of research publishing platform GMEdd.com
 Dmitriy Kozin, Seeking Alpha Contributor (2019–2020)
 Farris Husseini, data analytics professional, former Chewy employee
 Jenn Kruza, Founder of Kruza Capital LLC
 Tom Barton, Founder and President of White Rock Capital
 Jeff Tarzia, YouTuber, Technical Content Developer at AttackIQ
 Abbe Minor, Owner of Sun Built
 Rigoberto Alcaraz, college student, daytrader
 Andrew Left, Author and Editor of Citron Research

Reception

Box office 
In the United States, the film earned $74,782 from 267 theaters in its opening weekend.

Critical response 
The documentary holds a 79% approval rating on Rotten Tomatoes, based on 14 reviews.

Noel Murray at the Los Angeles Times felt that the film was strong from a stylistic and journalistic standpoint and that it did a great job of humanizing the players and supported a business instead of rooting for its failure.

Richard Whittaker at the Austin Chronicle found the documentary to be an "interesting analysis of the bubble in GameStop stock," yet he also criticized its "obnoxious enthusiasm" for not showing that the short squeeze investors are also stock market speculators that left the stock behind in a state as volatile as ever.

Josiah Teal at Film Threat stated the film was "tailor-made for a Reddit-savvy audience," and it "captures the unbridled essence of the Internet in a way gamers and meme-lords will adore."

Owen Good at Polygon stated the film introduced nine ordinary people, "who aren’t just the good guys of this story, they’re the best kinds of subjects a documentarian could want." Agreeing with the film's choice to call these nine investors “heroes,” Good believes the title fits. The senior reporter states that the real victory is the validation these investors found, not because they were proven right, but because they were willing to be wrong with all of their money, and that you can’t say the same about the big guys who lost billions of someone else’s.

References

External links 
 

2022 documentary films
GameStop
Films scored by Jeff Beal
2020s English-language films
Films directed by Jonah Tulis